The Traverse Mountains of Antarctica are a group of almost ice-free mountains, rising to about , and including McHugo Peak, Mount Noel, Mount Allan and Mount Eissinger, between Eureka Glacier and Riley Glacier, east of Warren Ice Piedmont, in western Palmer Land. These mountains were first photographed from the air on November 23, 1935, by Lincoln Ellsworth and were mapped from these photographs by W.L.G. Joerg. They were first surveyed in 1936 by the British Graham Land Expedition (BGLE) under John Rymill and resurveyed in 1948 by the Falklands Islands Dependencies Survey. The name was first used by BGLE sledging parties because the mountains are an important landmark in the overland traverse from the Wordie Ice Shelf, down Eureka Glacier, to George VI Sound.

Further reading 
 J. C. King, J. Turner, Antarctic Meteorology and Climatology, P 3

External links 

 Traverse Mountains on USGS website
  Traverse Mountains on SCAR website
 Traverse Mountains distance calculator
 Traverse Mountains current weather
 Traverse Mountains long term updated weather forecast
 Traverse Mountains historic weather data

References 
 

Mountain ranges of Palmer Land